Sangam is a village and a mandal in Warangal district in the state of Telangana in India.

Panchayats

The following is the list of village panchayats in Sangam mandal per the 2011 Census of India listing.

 Kuntapally
 Venkatapur (Haveli)
 Katrepale(Haveli)
 Kapulakanaparthy
 Ashalapally
 Gavicherla
 Ramachandrapur
 Lohitha
 Shapur
 Theegarajupalle
 Thimmapur
 Sangam
 Chintalapalle
 Pallaruguda
 Mondrai
 Narlavai
 Mummadivaram
 Elugur(Rangampet)
 Nallabelle
 Gandhinagar

References 

Mandals in Hanamkonda district
Villages in Hanamkonda district